Lucho is a Spanish nickname for the name Luis.

Lucho may refer to:
 Lucho (footballer, born 2003), Colombian footballer
 Lucho Avilés (1938–2019), Argentine journalist
 Lucho Ayala (born 1992), Filipino actor
 Lucho Barrios (1935–2010), Peruvian singer
 Lucho Bermúdez (1912–1994), Colombian musician
 Lucho Fernández (born 1975), Spanish basketball player
 Lucho García (born 1998), Colombian footballer
 Lucho Gatica (1928–2018), Chilean singer
 Lucho González (born 1981), Argentine footballer
 Lucho Olivera (1942–2005), Argentine comic book artist and writer
 Lucho Vega (born 1999), Argentine footballer

See also